I Got This is the ninth studio album by Canadian country music artist George Canyon. It was released on February 5, 2016 via Big Star Recordings. It includes the singles "I Got This" and "Daughters of the Sun".

Track listing

Chart performance

Album

Singles

ACurrent single.

References

2015 albums
George Canyon albums